Club Atlético Monarcas Morelia Premier was a professional football team that played in the Mexican Football League. They were playing in the Liga Premier (Mexico's Third Division). Club Atlético Monarcas Morelia Premier was affiliated with Monarcas Morelia who plays in the Liga MX. The games were held in the city of Morelia in the Estadio Morelos practice field.

References

 
Football clubs in Michoacán
Liga Premier de México